Sibi, l’âme du violon is a 2010 documentary film directed by Michel K. Zongo, first shown at Amiens International Film Festival.

Synopsis 
A blind violinist called Sibi has been singing and playing in carabets in the most popular neighborhoods of Koudougou, Burkina Faso, for more than 30 years. He knows the origins of the ethnic groups and the most important family lines in the region. Despite his blindness and the general indifference around him, he holds the living history of the region and its oral traditions, now threatened with extinction. This story is a message in a bottle, of sorts, for viewers to pay attention to his story before it is too late and these traditions disappear forever.

Awards 
 FESPACO 2011 Special Mention

External links
 

2010 films
Creative Commons-licensed documentary films
2010 short documentary films
Documentary films about blind people
Documentary films about African music
Burkinabé short documentary films